Asterolasia phebalioides, commonly known as downy starbush, is a species of shrub in the family Rutaceae and is endemic to south-eastern continental Australia. It has densely crowded heart-shaped to wedge-shaped leaves densely covered with star-shaped hairs, and single yellow flowers borne on the ends of branchlets with star-shaped hairs on the back of the petals.

Description
The flowers are borne singly on the ends of branchlets with five scaly bracts at the base. Flowering occurs from September to December.

Taxonomy
Asterolasia phebalioides was first formally described in 1854 by Ferdinand von Mueller and the description was published in Transactions of the Philosophical Society of Victoria.

Distribution and habitat
Downy starbush grows in woodland, forest and heath and occurs in the Grampians and Little Desert regions of Victoria and on Kangaroo Island in South Australia.

Conservation status
Asterolasia phebalioides is listed as "vulnerable" under the Australian Government Environment Protection and Biodiversity Conservation Act 1999 and a recovery plan has been prepared. The main threats to the species include vegetation clearance, weed invasion and disease caused by the fungus Phytophthora cinnamomi.

References

phebalioides
Flora of Victoria (Australia)
Sapindales of Australia
Flora of South Australia
Plants described in 1854
Taxa named by Ferdinand von Mueller